10 Kalpanakal (English: Ten Commandments) is a 2016 Indian Malayalam-language crime thriller film directed by Don Max. It is written by Shins K. Jose and Sangeeth Jain based on a story by Max. It stars Anoop Menon and Prashant Narayanan in lead roles, with Meera Jasmine, Shebin Benson, Kaniha, Joju George, and Thampi Antony in supporting roles. 10 Kalpanakal received positive reviews with critics praising the screenplay, the performances and direction.

Plot
10 Kalpanakal is told as a narration of a previous S.P, Shazia Akbar, to students of law and criminology. She narrates the strangest case in her career, one consisting forest officer Davis George, his family, Victor, a psychopath and Angel, whom he considered as his daughter. Angel is found dead in a forest after a festival. Shazia Akbar, a police officer, enters the scene but is unable to do anything and solve the case due to the lack of a convincing suspect with a motive and reason to suspect.  Years later, she runs upon the case of a probable psychopath, Victor, who abducts girls/women, locks them up in his house and takes their lives  brutally. Victor had the habit of storing photographs of his to-be victims. Among his photo gallery of to-be victims, a photo of Angel is discovered. Shazia contacts Davis and they try to get the truth out of Victor. Davis had suspicions on Vakkachan, whom he distrusted, but the latter himself says that it is not him and that if Davis puts more accusations on him to tarnish his image, he will end Davis. Victor requests to have a conversation with Davis and tells him that the former was merely an eye-witness to the actual murder and that the original killer was John, the son of Davis. Heartbroken on hearing these words, Davis attempts to pacify himself that it was not John. But circumstantial evidences such as him coming home late, his collection of photos of her, his tensed expression on his return, all point to him as the killer. In a heart wrenching way, David brings John to a statue of Jesus and asks him to beg for forgiveness to God and takes out his revolver. He attempts to kill his own son for the wrong he had done to Alice but John later reveals that he had loved her a lot and did in fact, meet her that night but the last time he saw her was before returning home. Victor too, on the way to court with Shazia, reveals that all he said that day, was to thwart Davis's suspicion and cloud his mind with emotional heartbreak instead of logical thinking. The court relieves Victor free of all accusations due to lack of evidence. Shazia considers this a failure because a dangerous psychopath like Victor was still free and would certainly cause more horrible deaths to many women. She ends her speech and later goes to visit Davis whose house was near the institution she lectured in. She has a talk with him and leaves but returns to the house again and sees her suspicions take the form of truth. Justice had been served. Davis had imprisoned Victor for several years after he had been set free and had made him suffer so that he could die a slow death. Victor begs Shazia to convince Davis to kill Victor. But Shazia and Davis smile at each other and the former walks away leaving the vindictive man to suffer for his brutal actions.

Cast
 Anoop Menon as Davis George
 Shebin Benson as John
 Prashant Narayanan as Victor
 Meera Jasmine as Shazia Akbar
 Ritika Badiani as Angel
 Joju George as Vakkachan
 Kaniha as Sara
 Kavitha Nair as Angel's mother
 Thampi Antony
 Ajay
 Jiji Anjani
 Binu Adimali

Soundtrack

The songs were composed by Mithun Eshwer. S. Janaki sung her final song "Ammapoovinum" in the film before her retirement. The song was released in an event at Abu Dhabi on 4 October 2016.

References

External links
 

2016 films
Indian crime thriller films
Films about organised crime in India
2016 crime thriller films
2010s Malayalam-language films